Riebeckite is a sodium-rich member of the amphibole group of silicate minerals, chemical formula Na2(Fe2+3Fe3+2)Si8O22(OH)2. It forms a solid solution series with magnesioriebeckite. It crystallizes in the monoclinic system, usually as long prismatic crystals showing a diamond-shaped cross section, but also in fibrous, bladed, acicular, columnar, and radiating forms. Its Mohs hardness is 5.0–6.0, and its specific gravity is 3.0–3.4. Cleavage is perfect, two directions in the shape of a diamond; fracture is uneven, splintery. It is often translucent to nearly opaque.

Name and discovery
Riebeckite was first described in 1888 for an occurrence on Socotra Island, Aden Governorate, Yemen, and named after German explorer Emil Riebeck (1853–1885).

The mineral is also known as crocidolite.

Occurrence
Riebeckite typically forms dark-blue elongated to fibrous crystals in highly alkali granites, syenites, rarely in felsic volcanics, granite pegmatites and schist. It occurs in banded iron formations as the asbestiform variety crocidolite (blue asbestos). It occurs in association with aegirine, nepheline, albite, arfvedsonite in igneous rocks; with tremolite, ferro-actinolite in metamorphic rocks; and with grunerite, magnetite, hematite, stilpnomelane, ankerite, siderite, calcite, chalcedonic quartz in iron formations.

Riebeckite granite

The riebeckite granite known as ailsite, found on the island of Ailsa Craig in western Scotland, is prized for its use in the manufacture of curling stones.

Riebeckite granite was used for the facing stones of the Canton Viaduct from Moyles Quarry (a.k.a. Canton Viaduct Quarry) now part of Borderland State Park in Massachusetts, US. The commonwealth's name is even taken from an Algonquian word for the Great Blue Hill, which got its color from this form of granite.

Crocidolite (fibrous riebeckite) 

The fibrous forms of riebeckite are known as crocidolite and are one of the six recognised types of asbestos. Often referred to as blue asbestos, it is considered the most hazardous. The association between blue asbestos and mesothelioma was established by J. C. Wager, C. A. Sleggs, and P. Marchand by 1960.

Crocidolite asbestos was mined in South Africa, Bolivia, and Wittenoom, Western Australia. Bolivian crocidolite was used in approximately 13 billion Kent Micronite cigarette filters, manufactured from March 1952 until at least May 1956 by the Lorillard Tobacco Company (now part of the R. J. Reynolds Tobacco Company). Blue asbestos was also used to similar effect, and hazard, in early gas masks.

See also

References

External links

 

Amphibole group
Asbestos
Iron(II,III) minerals
Magnesium minerals
Monoclinic minerals
Minerals in space group 12
Sodium minerals